The 2019 Spikers’ Turf Reinforced Conference is the thirteenth conference of the Spikers' Turf. The tournament began on May 19, 2019 at the Paco Arena. The Philippine men’s volleyball team is set to compete in this conference as preparations for the 2019 SEA Games.

Participating teams

Preliminary round 

 Team standings

|}

Point system:
3 points = win match in 3 or 4 sets
2 points = win match in 5 sets
1 point  = lose match in 5 sets
0 point  = lose match in 3 or 4 sets

Match results
All times are in Philippines Standard Time (UTC+08:00)

 

|}

Final round 

 All series are best-of-three.

Semifinals 
Rank #1 vs rank #4

|}

Rank #2 vs rank #3

|}

Finals 
Third place

|}

Championships

}
}
|}

Awards

Final standings

Venue
 Paco Arena, Paco, Manila

Broadcast partner 
 One Sports

See also 
 2019 Premier Volleyball League Reinforced Conference

References 

2019 in Philippine sport